The 2017–18 IUPUI Jaguars men's basketball team represented Indiana University – Purdue University Indianapolis during the 2017–18 NCAA Division I men's basketball season. The Jaguars, led by fourth-year head coach Jason Gardner, played their home games at Indiana Farmers Coliseum in Indianapolis, Indiana, with one home game at The Jungle, as first-year members of the Horizon League. They finished the season 11–19, 8–10 in Horizon League play to finish in a tie for fifth place. They lost in the quarterfinals of the Horizon League tournament to Oakland.

The season marked the first season as members of the Horizon League as IUPUI replaced Valparaiso who left the Horizon League to join the Missouri Valley Conference.

Previous season
The Jaguars finished the season 14–18, 7–9 in Summit League play to finish in seventh place. They defeated North Dakota State in the quarterfinals of The Summit League tournament to advance to the semifinals where they lost to Omaha.

This was the Jaguars' final season as a member of the Summit League as the school announced on June 28, 2017 that it would be joining the Horizon League effective July 1, 2017.

Departures

Incoming Transfers

Recruiting class of 2017

Roster

Schedule and results

|-
!colspan=9 style="| Exhibition

|-
!colspan=9 style="| Non-conference regular season

|-
!colspan=9 style=| Horizon League regular season

|-
!colspan=9 style=| Horizon League tournament

References

IUPUI Jaguars men's basketball seasons
IUPUI
IUPUI
IUPUI